Gregory Forbes may refer to:
Gregory S. Forbes (born 1950), weather presenter
Gregory W. Forbes, recipient of the 2012 David Richardson Medal